Titkuri is a village in Kamrup rural district, situated in north bank of river Brahmaputra, surrounded by Udiana, Goreswar and Baihata

Transport
The village is located north of National Highway 31, connected to nearby towns and cities with regular buses and other modes of transportation.

See also
 Ramdia
 Uparhali

References

Villages in Kamrup district